One Productions Limited, also known as the One Group, is a Maltese mass media and telecommunications company owned by the Labour Party. Its operations include the television station One, radio service One Radio, DAB+ radio service KISS, and mobile virtual network operator Redtouch Fone.

See also 
 Media.link Communications, counterpart media company owned by the Nationalist Party

References

Telecommunications companies of Malta
Labour Party (Malta)
Mass media companies of Malta
Political mass media in Malta